Frank Deerwester (died May 26, 1926) was the first president of Northwest Missouri State University from 1906 to 1907.

Butler was born in Bates County, Missouri and attended Butler College, the Second District Normal School, New York University, the University of Chicago and Harvard.

During his first year he fought funding battles over the Administration Building and set up education standards of the school.

Deerwester came from Warrensburg where he was professor of Pedagogy and he continued to teach the subject as well as be president.

The Fifth District Normal School opened on June 11, 1906 with Eliza Munn as the first student.

After leaving Northwest he taught at Pittsburg State University and Western Washington University.

References

Western Washington University faculty
1926 deaths
People from Bates County, Missouri
Pittsburg State University faculty
Presidents of Northwest Missouri State University
University of Central Missouri faculty
New York University alumni
Year of birth missing
George Washington University faculty